Sir Harry Braustyn Hylton Hylton-Foster (10 April 1905 – 2 September 1965), was a British Conservative Party politician who served as a Member of Parliament (MP) from 1950 until his death in 1965. He was also the Speaker of the House of Commons for the final six years of his life.

Early life
Hylton-Foster was born in Surrey, his father was a barrister, and he was educated at Eton College before reading jurisprudence at Magdalen College, Oxford, in which he graduated with a first-class degree. He was called to the bar by the Inner Temple in 1928, at which time he was also working as a legal secretary for Robert Finlay, 1st Viscount Finlay.

Military service
During the Second World War, Hylton-Foster served in the Royal Air Force volunteer reserve. He also served as a deputy judge advocate, a military judge, in North Africa.

Political career
After the end of the war, he stood as the Conservative candidate for the Shipley seat in the 1945 general election, but was unsuccessful. However, in the 1950 election he succeeded in taking the York seat, a seat he held for the next two elections before standing for the safer seat for the Cities of London and Westminster in the 1959 election. He was made King's Counsel in 1947.

In 1954, Hylton-Foster was named the Solicitor General for England and Wales, receiving the customary knighthood. The fact that he was serving as solicitor general when he was named speaker of the House of Commons in 1959 was a source of some controversy, which was compounded by the fact that the opposition Labour Party felt they had been insufficiently consulted about the nomination. However, once the controversy died down, Hylton-Foster proved to be a popular and respected speaker.

Personal life, death and aftermath
Hylton-Foster was married to the former Audrey Brown. 

On 2 September 1965, Hylton-Foster collapsed while walking along Duke Street, St James's. Attempts to resuscitate him were unsuccessful, and he was pronounced dead, aged 60, upon arrival at nearby St George's Hospital. Audrey Hylton-Foster was given a life peerage as Baroness Hylton-Foster in his honour the same year, and was granted a life annuity by the Honourable Lady Hylton-Foster's Annuity Act 1965.

Hylton-Foster and his wife are buried together in the churchyard of St Barnabas Church, Ranmore Common, Surrey.

Arms

References

External links
 

1905 births
1965 deaths
20th-century British lawyers
Alumni of Magdalen College, Oxford
Conservative Party (UK) MPs for English constituencies
Knights Bachelor
Members of the Privy Council of the United Kingdom
Ministers in the Eden government, 1955–1957
Ministers in the Macmillan and Douglas-Home governments, 1957–1964
Ministers in the third Churchill government, 1951–1955
People from Surrey
Politics of the City of London
Politics of the City of Westminster
Royal Air Force officers
Solicitors General for England and Wales
Speakers of the House of Commons of the United Kingdom
Spouses of life peers
UK MPs 1950–1951
UK MPs 1951–1955
UK MPs 1955–1959
UK MPs 1959–1964
UK MPs 1964–1966
People educated at Eton College
English barristers